Rubens de Falco da Costa (October 19, 1931 – August 22, 2008) was a Brazilian actor best known for his work in telenovelas, specifically his portrayal as a slave owner in the 1976 telenovela, Escrava Isaura (The Slave Isaura) and the 1986 telenovela Sinhá Moça (Little Missy).

Career
De Falco was born in São Paulo, Brazil on October 19, 1931. He began his acting career in the local theater. In 1955, he joined the group "Os Jograis", of São Paulo, and performed beside such actors as Ruy Afonso, Italo Rossi and Felipe Wagner. He made his cinema debut in 1952 in the film Apassionata, for the Cinematographic Company Vera Cruz.

In television, he had prominence parts in telenovelas such as O Rei dos Ciganos (1967), A Rainha Louca (1967), O Passo dos Ventos (1968), Gabriela (1975), O Grito (1975), Isaura, The Slave Girl (1976), Dona Xepa (1977), A Sucessora (1978) and Sinhá Moça (1986).

Perhaps his best-known work came in 1976, when he portrayed the cruel villain Leôncio Almeida, a powerful farm owner and ruthless slave owner in the telenovela Escrava Isaura. De Falco's character, Leôncio Almeida, fell in love with one of his slaves, played by Brazilian actress Lucélia Santos.

Escrava Isaura was extremely well received globally and became a hit in Africa, Eastern Europe and Latin America. Escrava Isaura was the first soap opera ever broadcast in Poland and Soviet Union and became the first television series to air in China with a foreign actress in the lead role. Rubens de Falco, who played Leôncio Almeida as one of his trademark villains, was called "the great villain of Brazilian television drama" by Lucélia Santos.

He again portrayed a powerful farm owner and ruthless slave owner, the cruel villain Baron de Araruna in the 1986 telenovela, Sinhá Moça alongside Lucélia Santos who starred this time as his rebellious daughter.

De Falco's last television appearance as an actor was as Almeida in 2004 in the Rede Record remake of A Escrava Isaura.

Death
Rubens de Falco died on February 22, 2008, of heart failure at the CIAI Center for the Aged in São Paulo, Brazil. He was not married and left no descendants.

Filmography

References

External links
 
 Rubens de Falco

1931 births
2008 deaths
Brazilian male telenovela actors
Brazilian male stage actors
Brazilian male film actors
Brazilian male television actors
Male actors from São Paulo